A sabbat is a Wiccan festival.

Sabbat may also refer to:

 Witches' Sabbath or Sabbat, a gathering of those considered to practice witchcraft and other rites 
 Sabbat (English band), a thrash metal band formed in the 1980s
 Sabbat (Japanese band), a black metal band formed in the 1980s
 Sabbat the Necromagus, a fictional character in Judge Dredd
 The Sabbat, a fictional sect in the tabletop game Vampire: The Masquerade
 Sabbat: The Black Hand, a game book about the sect
 Sabbat, an expansion for the related card game Vampire: The Eternal Struggle
 Kazimierz Sabbat (1913–1989), former president and prime minister of Poland-in-exile

See also
 
 Sabbath (disambiguation)